The Women's triple jump event  at the 2005 European Athletics Indoor Championships was held on March 4–6.

Medalists

Results

Qualification
Qualifying perf. 14.30 (Q) or 8 best performers (q) advanced to the Final.

Final

References
Results

Triple jump at the European Athletics Indoor Championships
Triple
2005 in women's athletics